Building Bridges (subtitled Australia Has a Black History) is an Australian compilation album containing tracks from both Aboriginal and non-Aboriginal performers inspired by a 1988 community concert called Building Bridges. The vinyl album was released in 1989 to raise money for the National Coalition of Aboriginal Organisations. It includes songs sung in Aboriginal languages. The vinyl album was released by CAAMA Music and distributed by CBS in 1989, followed by a CD album released by ABC in 1990. It reached #47 on the Australian album charts and may have symbolised "the embrace of indigenous rock by the mainstream". The original double-vinyl release features twenty-seven tracks while the later CD release features nineteen.

Track listing 
 Special Treatment – Paul Kelly
 Gudurrku (The Brolga) – Yothu Yindi
 Justice Will Be Done – Les Shillingsworth
 Solid Rock – Goanna
 Birth Of A Nation – Wild Pumpkins At Midnight
 Breakneck Road – Hunters & Collectors
 Yil Lull – Joe Geia
 Warakurna – Midnight Oil
 Woma Wanti – Areyonga Desert Tigers
 Strychinine – Swamp Jockeys
 That Hanging Business – Do-Re-Mi
 Injustice – V. Spy V. Spy
 Hungry Years – Weddings Parties Anything
 Do It Rite – Cal Callaghan
 Bad Blood – The Stetsons
 Original Sin – INXS
 Broken Down Man – Scrap Metal
 Dancing In The Moonlight – Coloured Stone
 Heaven On A Stick – James Reyne
 Speak No Evil – Dragon
 Tjamu Tjamu – Ilkari Maru
 Mansion In The Slums – Crowded House
 Spirit Of The Land – The Gravy
 Bullant – Gondwanaland
 Swing For The Crime – The Saints
 Living In The Land Of Oz – Ross Wilson
 We Have Survived – No Fixed Address

References

1989 compilation albums